The 2016 European Fencing Championships were held in Toruń, Poland from 20 to 25 June 2016 at the Arena Toruń.

Schedule

Medal summary

Men's events

Women's events

Medal table

 Host

Results

Men

Foil individual

Épée individual

Sabre individual

Foil team

Épée team

Sabre team

Women

Foil individual

Épée individual

Sabre individual

Foil team

Épée team

Sabre team

External links
Official website

2016
European Fencing Championships
2016 European Fencing Championships
2016 in Polish sport
Sport in Toruń
European Fencing Championships